This article shows the rosters of all participating teams at the 2016 Asian Women's Cup Volleyball Championship in Vinh Phuc, Vietnam.

Head Coach: Chen Youquan
The following is the Chinese roster in the 2016 Asian Cup Championship.

Head Coach: Majda Cicic
The following is the Iranian roster in the 2016 Asian Cup Championship.

Head Coach: Kiyoshi Abo
The following is the Japanese roster in the 2016 Asian Cup Championship.

Head Coach: Shapran Vyacheslav
The following is the Kazakhstani roster in the 2016 Asian Cup Championship.

Head Coach: Kim Cheol-yong
The following is the Korean roster in the 2016 Asian Cup Championship.

Head Coach: Lin Ming-hui
The following is the Taiwanese roster in the 2016 Asian Cup Championship.

Head Coach: Danai Sriwatcharamethakul
The following is the Thai roster in the 2016 Asian Cup Championship.

Head Coach: Thai Thanh Tung
The following is the Vietnamese roster in the 2016 Asian Cup Championship.

External links
Official website

Asian
Asian volleyball championships women's squads